Shamsabad Rural District is a rural district (dehestan) in the Central District of Arak County, Markazi Province, Iran. At the 2006 census, its population was 6,004, in 1,645 families. The rural district has 19 villages.

References 

Rural Districts of Markazi Province
Arak County